The Swon Brothers are an American country music duo from Muskogee, Oklahoma, consisting of Zach Swon (born February 21, 1985) and Colton Swon (born August 17, 1988). In 2013, they finished in third place on the fourth season of NBC's The Voice. They were the first duo to make it from the Top 12 live shows to the season finale.

On November 1, 2013, the Swon Brothers signed a record deal with Arista which is part of the Sony group. They released their first official single, "Later On", the following month. On October 14, 2014, the Swon Brothers released their self-titled debut album, before parting ways with Arista the following year.

Early life
The Swon Brothers, Zach and Colton, were born in Muskogee, Oklahoma, to Kelly and Tammy Swon.  Colton Swon was born on August 17, 1988, while Zach was born on February 21, 1985. Colton attended elementary school in Hilldale, Muskogee, and later attended school with his brother Zach in Oktaha, where he left after eighth grade to go to Hilldale High School.  Zach Swon studied at the Northeastern State University and worked at the Oklahoma Music Hall of Fame in Muskogee.

The brothers started performing when they were children, touring with their parents' Southern gospel group Exodus, and performing in various local events and stages. By the time Zach Swon was 9 or 10, he was playing drums for his parents’ band.  In 1995, the Swon Brothers’ parents formed a family-style variety show in Wagoner called Westwood Music Show, where the Brothers performed songs ranging from Elvis to Frank Sinatra, as well as starting to perform in the country music genre.  In 2000, when they were 12 and 15, the brothers started calling themselves The Swon Brothers, and appeared in various venues.

In 2007, Colton Swon auditioned for the seventh season of American Idol (aired 2008) and reached the Top 48.  Both Zach and Colton also appeared as contestants in 2007 on a local TV show Gimme the Mike. The Swon Brothers have released a couple of independent albums with songs including "Oklahoma Lovin’" and "This Close to Gone". Their first professionally recorded album Another Day, which they described as modern country, was released on January 16, 2009. They cited The Eagles as their musical influence.

The Voice

The Swon Brothers auditioned for The Voice on a whim when asked by their keyboard player, James Redden, who wanted them to audition with him. During the blind auditions, The Swon Brothers performed Tom Petty and the Heartbreakers's "American Girl", turning three chairs, Usher, Blake Shelton, and Shakira on April 1, 2013. They proceeded to choose Blake as their coach and remained on his team the whole season. During the Top 8 Live Performances, The Swon Brothers chose to sing Seven Bridges Road as a tribute to victims of the 2013 Moore tornado. They finished in third place making them the farthest duo in the voice.

 – Studio version of performance reached the top 10 on iTunes

Post-The Voice career

The Swon Brothers signed a recording contract with Arista Nashville after appearing in The Voice.  They released a single "Later On" on December 10, 2013, the first single from their self-titled album released on October 14, 2014.  They debuted the single on The Voice the same day.  It sold 23,000 copies in its debut week. In October 2015, the duo parted ways with Arista due to creative differences. On January 29, 2016, they released the EP Timeless. They also opened for Carrie Underwood's Storyteller Tour in 2016.

Discography

Albums

Compilation albums

Extended plays

Singles

Competition singles

 Repeat performance in finale.

Music videos

References

External links
 
 
 The Swon Brothers at The Voice
 Official website

Living people
American musical duos
Country music duos
Musical groups established in 2000
The Voice (franchise) contestants
Participants in American reality television series
Arista Nashville artists
Sibling musical duos
Country musicians from Oklahoma
Northeastern State University alumni
Year of birth missing (living people)